The South Down by-election of 1986 was part of a co-ordinated series of by-elections aimed to show opposition to the Anglo Irish agreement.  It resulted in the narrow victory of the incumbent Ulster Unionist Party, Enoch Powell, who increased his majority by 1,294 votes despite rising support for Irish Nationalist candidates.  His opponent Eddie McGrady would later take the seat in the 1987 general election.

Previous result

External links 
A Vision Of Britain Through Time

References

South Down by-election
By-elections to the Parliament of the United Kingdom in County Down constituencies
20th century in County Down